Chamaepus is a genus of flowering plants belonging to the family Asteraceae. It contains a single species, Chamaepus afghanicus.

Its native range is Afghanistan.

References

Gnaphalieae
Monotypic Asteraceae genera